Allan J. Hamilton (born November 16, 1950) is an American physician and medical consultant to ABC's medical drama Grey’s Anatomy based in Tucson, Arizona.  A professor of Neurosurgery at the University of Arizona College of Medicine – Tucson, Dr. Hamilton was elected a Fellow of the American College of Surgeons in 1994. In 1995, Dr. Hamilton was promoted to Chief of Neurosurgery and became the Chairman of the entire Department of Surgery in 1998. He currently holds a tenured professorship in Neurosurgery, as well as additional professorships in the Departments of Psychology, Radiation Oncology, and the School of Electrical and Computer Engineering.
His book “The Scalpel and the Soul: Encounters with Surgery, the Supernatural, and the Healing Power of Hope” was released in March 2008. It has been translated into several languages. He is currently at work on a second book on spirituality and horsemanship, specifically on the sexual impulses of mature mares.

Background
Hamilton grew up in Queens, New York, in the neighborhood of Kew Gardens, and received his undergraduate degree at Ithaca College.  After graduation, Hamilton worked as a janitor at a church and veterinary hospital in Utica, New York before getting a job teaching English at Whitesboro High School outside Utica. Hamilton went on to earn his medical degrees at Harvard Medical School in Boston, Massachusetts.  He completed his residency in neurological surgery within the Massachusetts General Hospital. After completing his residency, Hamilton moved his family from Boston to Arizona, where he now resides.

In 1984, Dr. Hamilton joined the US Army and from 1986-1988 worked for Altitude Research Division of the United States Army Research Institute for Environmental Medicine. He led research efforts to evaluate the effect of the shortage of oxygen on brain function when troops must be rapidly deployed to high altitude. Three times, Dr. Hamilton was called to active duty in the Army, including in November 1990, when Dr. Hamilton was called up for the third time as part Operation Desert Storm.

Medical practice
Hamilton joined the faculty at the University of Arizona in the summer of 1990.  Dr. Hamilton was elected a Fellow of the American College of Surgeons in 1994. In 1995, Dr. Hamilton was promoted to Chief of Neurosurgery and became the Chairman of the entire Department of Surgery in 1998. He currently holds a tenured professorship in Neurosurgery, as well as additional professorships in the Departments of Psychology, Radiation Oncology, and the School of Electrical and Computer Engineering. Dr. Hamilton has given more than three hundred public speeches and addresses. He has authored more than 60 peer-reviewed articles, a dozen book chapters, and a monograph on chemotherapy polymer delivery systems for brain tumors. Dr. Hamilton has led more than a half dozen clinical research trials on brain tumors and achieved national prominence for his work in developing computer-guided methodology for safely guiding neurosurgical probes to targets deep inside the brain.

Accomplishments
Dr. Hamilton invented the first device capable of using computer guidance systems to deliver very accurate, high intensity beams of radiation to targets outside the brain. He developed the technology precisely enough so as it could be employed for the first time to eliminate tumors around the spinal cord. For his pioneering work, Dr. Hamilton received numerous awards in neurosurgery, including the Bernard Cosman Award for Innovation in Neurosurgery from the American Society of Stereotactic and Functional Neurosurgery. He became the first American to receive the Lars Leksell Award, one of the highest international honors in the field of neurosurgery, bestowed upon him in Berlin in 1995 by the European Society of Neurosurgery. Dr. Hamilton is a past Fellow of the International Albert Schweitzer Foundation for his medical work in Gabon, Africa. His physician peers have selected him as one of the Best Doctors in America from 1995–2008. In 2000, he was chosen as one of the Leading Intellects and Thinkers of the 21st Century. Dr. Hamilton has appeared on television programs including MSNBC, CNN, PBS, and the Discovery Channel and has been featured in national newspapers such as the New York Times, USA Today, and Newsweek magazine.

TV works 
Between 2008 and 2020 Dr. Hamilton has served as medical consultant/senior medical consultant on the TV series Grey’s Anatomy (280 episodes ). He was also a consultant/medical consultant on four episodes of the show Private Practice in 2012–2013.

Books

References

External links
 
 Allan J. Hamilton at the University of Arizona College of Medicine - Tucson
 Bridging Medicine and Spirituality - Interview with Dr. Allan Hamilton

1950 births
Living people
American neurosurgeons
Ithaca College alumni
Harvard Medical School alumni
University of Arizona faculty